The Bornless Ritual, also known as the Preliminary Invocation, is a ritual of Western ceremonial magic generally used as an Invocation of the Knowledge and Conversation of the Holy Guardian Angel, since it was introduced as such by the Hermetic Order of the Golden Dawn.

Derivation
It was derived from the Greek Magical Papyri, specifically PGM V. 96-172: "Stele of Jeu the Hieroglyphist in his letter."

Here is an example stanza as translated by Hans Dieter Betz:

Use
It is often considered the proper preliminary invocation to the Ars Goetia since it was introduced as such by Aleister Crowley.

References

Citations

Works cited

Further reading

Ceremonial magic
Magic rituals
Thelema